The Witness is a 2012 Indonesian–Filipino horror action film directed by Muhammad Yusuf and starring Gwen Zamora, Pierre Gruno, Agung Saga, Kimberly Ryder, Marcellino Lefrandt, and Feby Febiola. It was written by Beby Hasibuan. Released on March 21, 2012, in the Philippines and on April 26, 2012, in Indonesia, the film was an international joint production between GMA Pictures (Philippines) and Skylar Pictures (Indonesia).

Plot
Angel Williams (Gwen Zamora) is an assistant manager of a Hotel who has just moved  from Manila to Jakarta to be with her ex-patriate family. She is haunted by a weird recurring dream about a young man committing suicide.

One day, her family is slaughtered, leaving no one alive. Her parents, her only sister Safara (Kimberly Ryder), her maid, and security, are all dead. She was also chased down and shot by the killer but somehow she manages to survive, having a vivid memory of what the killer looked like, but not knowing who he is.

Angel begins seeing apparitions of her sister and sees visions of events that led to her family's deaths.  A detective investigates the tragedy but believes Angel's experiences are just her psyche acting out. Angel decides to follow the trail her sister's apparitions lead her to and discover who her sister has become in the past few years, with the trail leading straight to the killer himself.

Cast
 Gwen Zamora as Angel Williams
 Pierre Gruno as Satria Datta
 Agung Saga as Aris 'Ais' Mahandra Datta
 Kimberly Ryder as Safara Williams
 Marcellino Lefrandt as Detective Indra
 Feby Febiola as Celine
 Nigel Ryder as Aldo Williams

Music
The main theme for The Witness is "Before I Die" by Pika Airplay and Izzal Peterson. In the film it serves as the single that Aris' band had just released, with Agung Saga singing to Airplay's vocals. It is used both as an in-story musical number, as well as incidental music, given that half of the song is a ballad which ceases and crashes into a heavier, more emotional instrumental, which is also used for the song's ending track. A promotional version sung by Derrick Monasterio was released for promotional purposes.

Another song by Izzal Peterson and Pika Airplay is "Aurora" which serves as Aira and Safara's happier love theme.

References

External links

Skylar Pictures official website
The Witness: Movie Review

2012 films
2010s Tagalog-language films
2010s English-language films
2010s Indonesian-language films
Philippine television films
2012 horror films
GMA Pictures films
Indonesian action horror films
Philippine action horror films
2012 multilingual films
Indonesian multilingual films
Philippine multilingual films